Adfa is a village in the Welsh county of Powys, in mid Wales. It is in the historic county of Montgomeryshire.

External links 
Photos of Adfa and surrounding area on geograph

 

Villages in Powys